Angel Mine is a 1978 New Zealand fantasy fiction film.

Synopsis
Angel Mine is advertised as a drug for automatically solving marital problems. A young Auckland middle class suburban couple become entangled in this surrealistic world switching between reality and fantasy while attempting to model their lives on media advertising in a world of black leather and punk music.

Cast
 Derek Ward as The Man
 Jennifer Redford as The Woman
 Myra De Groot as Nun
 Michael Wilson

Reviews
 1978 The Press "Caution: viewing may be damaging".
 1994 Cinema Papers New Zealand Supplement.
 2001 Festival/Awards: NZ Drifting Clouds Film Festival.

References

External links

1978 films
1970s New Zealand films
Films shot in New Zealand
Films set in New Zealand